Petalostomella is a monotypic moth genus in the family Gelechiidae described by Thomas Bainbrigge Fletcher in 1940. It contains the species Petalostomella lygrodes, described by Edward Meyrick in 1940, which is found in Assam, India.

References

Gelechiinae